St. Francis is a 2002 Italian television movie written and directed by Michele Soavi. The film is based on real life events of Roman Catholic Friar and then Saint Francis of Assisi.

Plot

Cast 

Raoul Bova as Francis
Gianmarco Tognazzi as  Bernardo  
 Amélie Daure  as   Clare
Claudio Gioè as  Peter 
Paolo Briguglia as  Sylvester 
 Mariano Rigillo  as  Pietro di Bernardone
Erika Blanc as  Monna Pica
 Sergio Romano as  Friar Elias
 Gabriele Bocciarelli as   Friar Masseo 
 Fausto Paravidino as   Friar Gineprus
 Nino D'Agata as  Friar Lion 
Toni Bertorelli as  Pope Innocent III
 David Brandon as Favarone
Luca Lionello as  The Young Tailor

References

External links

2002 television films
2002 films
Italian television films
2002 biographical drama films
Films set in Italy
Italian biographical drama films
Films about Catholic priests
Films about religion
Films directed by Michele Soavi
Cultural depictions of Francis of Assisi
Films scored by Carlo Siliotto
2000s Italian films